Clodagh C. O'Shea is a professor of molecular and cell biology and current Wicklow Chair at the Salk Institute for Biological Sciences and a scholar at the Howard Hughes Medical Institute.

Education
O'Shea has a BS in biochemistry and microbiology from University College Cork, Ireland and a PhD from Imperial College London. She was a Postdoctoral Fellow at the UCSF Comprehensive Cancer Center, San Francisco, United States.

Selected publications

Awards

 2018 Paul G. Allen Frontiers Group's Allen Distinguished Investigator
 2016 Howard Hughes Medical Institute Faculty Scholar
 2014 W. M. Keck Medical Research Program Award
 2014 Rose Hills Fellow
 2011Science/NSF International Science & Visualization Challenge, People's Choice
 2011 Anna Fuller Award for Cancer Research
 2010, 2011, 2012 Kavli Frontiers Fellow, National Academy of Sciences
 2009 Sontag Distinguished Scientist Award
 2009 American Cancer Society Research Scholar Award
 2008 ACGT Young Investigator Award for Cancer Gene Therapy
 2008 Arnold and Mabel Beckman Young Investigators Award
 2008 William Scandling Assistant Professor, Developmental Chair
 2007 Emerald Foundation Scholar

References

Further reading 
 
 
 
 
 

Living people
Irish biologists
Alumni of University College Cork
Alumni of Imperial College London
Year of birth missing (living people)